Zachariae Isstrom (Isstrøm being the Danish word for ice stream) is a large glacier located in King Frederick VIII Land, northeast Greenland.

This glacier was named by the Denmark expedition 1906–08 after Georg Hugh Robert Zachariae (1850–1937), an officer of the Danish Navy.

Geography
The glacier holds a 0.5-meter sea-level rise equivalent.

Zachariae Isstrøm has its terminus in the northern part of Jokel Bay, south of Lambert Land and north of Nørreland, near the Achton Friis Islands.
It terminates into an embayment previously packed with multi-year calf ice.

Glacier retreat

Zachariae Isstrøm broke loose from a stable position in 2012 and entered a phase of accelerated retreat as predicted in 2008.

From a state of approximate mass balance until 2003 it is now losing mass at about 5 Gt/yr. The ice velocity increased by 50% in 2000–2014. In 2012 it detached from a stabilizing sill and retreated rapidly along a downward-sloping, marine-based bed with substantial calving.

See also
List of glaciers in Greenland

References

External links
Radar studies velocity map 2012 version

Glaciers of Greenland